Gačnik is a settlement in the Municipality of Pesnica in northeastern Slovenia. It lies in the western part of the Slovene Hills in the valley of Gačnik Creek, a minor tributary of the Pesnica River. The area is part of the traditional region of Styria. It is now included in the Drava Statistical Region.

A small roadside chapel-shrine in the settlement dates to 1803.

References

External links
Gačnik on Geopedia

Populated places in the Municipality of Pesnica